Holothrix filicornis is a species of plant in the family Orchidaceae. It is endemic to Namibia.  Its natural habitats are subtropical or tropical dry shrubland and rocky areas. It is threatened by habitat loss.

References

filicornis
Least concern plants
Endemic flora of Namibia
Taxonomy articles created by Polbot